Sergey Mergelyan (19 May 1928 – 20 August 2008) was a Soviet Armenian mathematician, who made major contributions to the  Approximation Theory. The modern Complex Approximation Theory is based on Mergelyan's classical work.
Corresponding Member Academy of Sciences of USSR (since 1953), member of NAS ASSR (since 1956). 

The surname "Mergelov" given at birth was changed for patriotic reasons to the more Armenian-sounding "Mergelyan" by the mathematician himself before his trip to Moscow.

He was a laureate of the USSR State Prize (1952) and the Order of St. Mesrop Mashtots (2008). He was the youngest Doktor nauk in the history of the USSR (at the age of 20), and the youngest corresponding member of the USSR Academy of Sciences (the title was conferred at the age of 24). During his postgraduate studies, the 20-year-old Mergelyan solved one of the fundamental problems of the mathematical theory of functions, which had not been solved for more than 70 years. His theorem on the possibility of uniform polynomial approximation of functions of a complex variable is recognized by the classical Mergelyan theorem, and is included in the course of the theory of functions.

Although he himself was not a computer designer, Mergelyan was a pioneer in Soviet computational mathematics.

Biography

Early years
Sergey Mergelyan was born on 19 May 1928 in Simferopol in an Armenian family. His father Nikita (Mkrtich) Ivanovich Mergelov, a former private entrepreneur (Nepman), his mother Lyudmila Ivanovna Vyrodova, the daughter of the manager of the Azov-Black Sea bank, who was shot in 1918. In 1936 Sergey's father was building a paper mill in Yelets, but soon together with his family was deported to the Siberian settlement of Narym, Tomsk Region. In the Siberian frost, Sergey suffered from a serious illness and narrowly survived. In 1937, the mother and son were acquitted by the court's decision and returned to Kerch, and in 1938 Lyudmila Ivanovna obtained (from the USSR Prosecutor General Andrei Yanushyevich Vyshinsky) the rehabilitation of her husband. In 1941, in connection with the offensive of the Hitler armies to the South, the Mergelov family left Kerch and settled in Yerevan.

Education 
Before the war, Mergelyan lived in Russia, and studied at the Kerch secondary school. When at the end of 1941 his family has moved from Kerch to Yerevan, he got into a completely unfamiliar environment,  he did not know Armenian at all. He studied at the Yerevan school named after Mravyan. Soon he excelled in his abilities. In 1943, Mergelyan won the first place at the republican physics and mathematics Olympiad. In 1944, at age 16, he passed the examinations via extern for grades 9-10, graduated from high school and immediately entered the Physics and Mathematics Faculty of the Yerevan State University (YSU).

He drew attention to himself at the university, where he during a year passed the first and second courses, and soon began attending lectures of academician Artashes Shahinyan, the founder of the Armenian mathematical school. In addition to studying and working in the seminar, Mergelyan taught in the mathematical circle at the Yerevan Palace of Pioneers. There he gave full freedom to fantasy, writing puzzles for children by conducting competitions to solve particularly difficult tasks and organizing mathematical games.

He passed a five-year university course for three years, in the first year he studied only a few days, then via extern had passed exams and immediately switched to the second, and in 1946 he received a diploma.
At the same time, he restored the original surname on his father's line and received a diploma already as Sergey Nikitovich Mergelyan. 

After YSU (1946), Mergelyan entered the postgraduate study at Steklov Institute of Mathematics to Mstislav Vsevolodovich Keldysh. Although all his colossal employment, Keldysh paid special attention to his new graduate student. They met mainly at Keldysh's house, at 8-9 o'clock in the evening, and conducted long conversations about mathematical problems. 

A thesis for the degree on physical and mathematical sciences, Mergelyan wrote for a year and a half. The defense took place in 1949 and was brilliant. After an hour and a half session, the academic council announced the awarding of a doctorate in physics and mathematics to Mergelyan. Although Mergelyan introduced to defend the Ph.D. dissertation, all three official opponents - Academician Lavrent'ev, Sergei Mikhailovich Nikol'skii and Corresponding Member Alexander Osipovich Gelfоnd - petitioned the Academic Council to award him the Doctor of Science degree. 

The petition of opponents was satisfied (for this it was necessary to call the members of the scientific council, which took time), and Mergelyan became the youngest doctor of physical and mathematical sciences in the USSR at the age of 20 (at 21).

Until today this is a record of getting the highest scientific degree (Doctor of Science) at such a young age in former USSR and present Russia.

Career 
Mergelyan graduated from Yerevan University in 1947. From 1945 to 1957 he worked at the Yerevan University, and from 1954 to 1958 and from 1964 to 1968 at the Moscow State University named after MV Lomonosov.

When he was 24 he became a corresponding member of the Academy of Sciences of the USSR (now Russian Academy of Sciences), which, from the point of view of young age, is yet another absolute record among USSR scientists. He has been a symbol of a young scientist in former USSR. Indira Gandhi, among other famous people in USSR and abroad, has been a friend of Mergelyan from the early 1950s. In 1978, after her official visit to Moscow, Gandhi had also a private visit to Yerevan just as a guest of Mergelyan.In 1952 he was awarded USSR State Prize.

Mergelyan was also a talented organizer of science. He played a leading role in establishing Yerevan Scientific Research Institute of Mathematical Machines (YerSRIMM). On 14 July 1956 the Yerevan Scientific Research Institute of Mathematical Machines (YerNIIMM) was founded․ He became the first director of the institute and headed it in 1956-1960. Soon the institute became popular as the "Mergelyan Institute". This unofficial name is preserved and still used nowadays․

In 1961 he returned to the field of pure mathematics. He resumed work at the Moscow Steklov Mathematical Institute of Academy of Sciences of the USSR. In 1963 he was elected Deputy Academician of the Secretary of the Department of Mathematics of the USSR Academy of Sciences (Nikolai Nikolaevich Bogolyubov). In 1964 he was appointed head of the department of complex analysis at the Mathematical Institute, the position he retained until 2002, the same year he was reinstated as a professor of the Mechanics and Mathematics Faculty of the Moscow State University.

In 1968, he again left the post of professor of the faculty and only engaged in scientific work. Mergelyan had "traveling permission", and often was on foreign business trips. In 1970 he gave a presentation as a guest speaker at the International Congress of Mathematicians in Nice.

Scientific works 
Mergelyan's main works include theory of functions of complex variables, theory of approximation, and theory of potential and  harmonic functions. In 1951 he formulated and proved the famous result from complex analysis called Mergelyan's theorem. This solved an old classical problem. The theorem completed a long series of studies, begun in 1885, and composed of the classical results of Karl Weierstrass, Karl Runge, J. Walsh, Mikhail Lavrentiev, Mstislav Keldysh and others. The new terms "Mergelyan's theorem" and "Mergelyan's sets" found their place in textbooks and monographs on approximation theory.

Several years later he solved another famous problem, the Sergei Natanovich Bernstein Approximation Problem. Mergelyan also has many important results in other areas of complex analysis including the theory of pointwise approximations by polynomials.

His research was the study of the approximation of continuous functions satisfying the smoothness properties for an arbitrary set (1962) and the solution of Bernstein's approximate problem (1963). Mergelyan conducted in-depth studies and obtained valuable results in such areas as best approximation by polynomials on an arbitrary continuum, weighted approximations by polynomials on the real axis, pointwise approximation by polynomials on closed sets of the complex plane, uniform approximation by harmonic functions on compact sets and entire functions on an unbounded continuum, uniqueness harmonic functions. In the theory of differential equations, his results related to the sphere of the Cauchy problem and some other questions. Mergelyan's scientific achievements significantly contributed to the formation, development and international recognition of the Armenian mathematical school, as evidenced by the one organized in Yerevan in 1965, at the initiative and with the active participation of Sergey Mergelyan a major international conference on the theory of functions. Many prominent mathematicians of the world took part in the conference, which promoted international cooperation and further promotion of the Armenian mathematical school.

Death 
Sergey Mergelyan died on 20 August 2008. The farewell ceremony took place on 23 August 2008 at the Glendale Cemetery in California. At the request of the deceased, his ashes were transported to Moscow and buried at Novodevichy Cemetery next to his mother and his wife.

Awards and prizes 
The Stalin Prize of the Second Degree (1952) for works on the constructive theory of functions, completed by the article "Some Problems in the Constructive Theory of Functions", published in the Proceedings of the Steklov Mathematical Institute of the USSR Academy of Sciences (1951)
Order of St. Mesrop Mashtots (26.05.2008) - On the occasion of the 80th anniversary of mathematician, the Consul General of Armenia in the USA handed over the Order of St. Mesrop Mashtots to the scientist and read the message of the President of Armenia, Serzh Sargsyan.
Order of the Red Banner of Labor (17.09.1975)

Works
 «Некоторые вопросы конструктивной теории функций» (Труды Математического института АН СССР, т. 3, 1951)
 «Равномерные приближения функций комплексного переменного» (Успехи математических наук, т. 8, вып. 2, 1952), 
 «О полноте систем аналитических функций» (Успехи математических наук, т. 7, вып. 4, 1953)

References

External links
 National Academy of Sciences of Armenia
 Russian Academy of Sciences
 A Guide to the Russian Academy of Sciences, Part I, by Jack L. Cross
 

1928 births
2008 deaths
Scientists from Simferopol
Academic staff of Yerevan State University
20th-century Armenian mathematicians
Burials at Novodevichy Cemetery
Mathematical analysts
Corresponding Members of the Russian Academy of Sciences
Yerevan State University alumni
Soviet Armenians
Soviet mathematicians
Armenian emigrants to the United States
Armenian academics
Yerevan Computer Research and Development Institute